Rudi Krausmann (23 July 1933 in Mauerkirchen, Salzburg – 15 March 2019 in Sydney) was an Austrian born Australian playwright and poet.

Life 

Rudi Krausmann studied Economics in Vienna and worked as a journalist for the Austrian newspaper, Salzburger Nachrichten. In 1958 he migrated to Australia where he worked as a part-time German tutor, freelance-writer and as a broadcaster on Radio 2EA-FM and 2SER-FM. He founded and from 1975 to 1989 also edited Aspect: Art and Literature magazine, and was presenter of the German Language Program on SBS Radio.

Since 1969 he has had numerous books published in small presses such as Wild & Woolley and Hale & Iremonger (Sydney). From 1989 to 1994 he was translator (with Gerald Ganglbauer and others) and editor (with Michael Wilding and Gisela Triesch) for the Austrian-Australian Gangaroo (Gangan Verlag, Vienna). More recently he collaborated with visual artists such as Garry Shead and Andrew Sibley in printing numbered and signed limited edition books. He lived in Sydney and traveled frequently overseas.

Krausmann died in Sydney on 15 March 2019.

Bibliography

Books 

 From Another Shore. Prose by Rudi Krausmann. Drawings by Brett Whiteley. (Wild & Woolley, 1975)
 The Water Lily and Other Poems. Poems by Rudi Krausmann. (Makar Press, 1977)
 Recent German Poetry. Edited by Rudi Krausmann. (Aspect Publications, 1977)
 Paradox: Man and Beast: Stones. Poems by Rudi Krausmann. Illustrations by Lorraine Krausmann. (Aspect Publications, 1981)
 Life is Nothing New. Poems by Rudi Krausmann. (1982)
 Flowers of Emptiness. Poems by Rudi Krausmann. (Hale & Iremonger, 1982)
 Literature. Written and Edited by Rudi Krausmann. Photographs Michal Kluvanek, Vivienne Mehes & Effy Alexakis. (1987)
 Air mail from Down Under: Zeitgenössische Literatur aus Australien. Short Stories. Edited by Rudi Krausmann and Michael Wilding. (Gangan Verlag, 1990)
 Poems: Rudi Krausmann. Drawings: Gary Shead. (Gangan Verlag / Wild & Woolley, 1991)
 Made in Australia: Die Poesie des fünften Kontinents. Australian Poetry Today: Gegenwartsdichtung Australiens. Bilingual. Edited by Rudi Krausmann and Gisela Triesch. (Gangan Verlag, 1994)
 The Journey and Other Poems. Poems by Rudi Krausmann. Drawings by Gary Shead. (Gangan Verlag, 1999)
 Maps. Poems in German and English by Rudi Krausmann. Illustrations by Andrew Sibley. (2002)
 News. Poems in German and English by Rudi Krausmann. Illustrations by Gary Shead. (2006)

Plays 

 Everyman: a sentence situation. (1978)
 The Leader. (Broadcast on ABC Radio National, 1980)
 Three Plays. (Hale & Iremonger, 1989)
 Whisky on Snow. (Broadcast on ABC Radio National, 1999)

References

External links 

 Krausmann, Rudi - Poet - Australian Poetry Library
 Rudi Krausmann: Travel Diary Gangan Raw Cut, 1996.
 Rudi Krausmann: Thomas Bernhard in: Gangan Lit-Mag #1, 1996.
 Rudi Krausmann: Fragments in: Gangan Lit-Mag #11, 1999.

1933 births
2019 deaths
Australian poets
Austrian expatriates in Australia